Stromboli is a 2022 Dutch drama film released by Netflix, starring Elise Schaap as the main lead. It is based on an eponymous 2018 novel by Saskia Noort.

The film focuses on Sara, who confronts her painful past by going on a retreat on the Sicilian volcanic island of Stromboli.

References

2022 films
2022 drama films
Dutch drama films
Dutch psychological drama films
Dutch-language Netflix original films
English-language Netflix original films
2020s Dutch-language films
2020s English-language films
2022 multilingual films
Dutch multilingual films
Films set in Sicily
Films set on islands